(Behold, the lion has triumphed), TWV 1:1328, BWV 219, is a church cantata by Georg Philipp Telemann, written for Michaelmas in 1723. Formerly the cantata was accredited to Johann Sebastian Bach.

History and text 
The cantata was performed  in Hamburg in 1723 and again in 1728.

The text is by Erdmann Neumeister.

Scoring and structure 
The work is scored for soprano, alto and bass soloists, four-part choir, two trumpets, two violins, viola and basso continuo.

It has five movements:
Chorus: 
Aria (bass): 
Recitative (soprano): 
Aria (alto): 
Chorale:

Recording 
Alsfelder Vokalensemble / Steintor Barock Bremen, Wolfgang Helbich. The Apocryphal Bach Cantatas. CPO, 1991.

References

External links 
 

1723 compositions
Sacred vocal music by Georg Philipp Telemann
Bach: spurious and doubtful works